François Dumont (1688 – 14 December 1726) was a French sculptor.

Early life
Dumont was the son of the sculptor Pierre Dumont and Marie Mercier. He was a native of the Place Saint-Sulpice in Paris, and the brother of Jacques Dumont le Romain (1704-1781), painter. In 1709 he was awarded the Prix de Rome. Approved the previous year, François Dumont was received on 24 September 1712, at the Académie royale de peinture et de sculpture (Royal Academy of Painting and Sculpture).

Marriage
On November 21, 1712, Dumont married: "In the Church of Saint-Germain l'Auxerrois in the presence of his parents, miss Anne-Françoise Coypel, aged 24 years, daughter of the late Noël Coypel (1628-1707), vivant peintre ordinaire du Roi and Anne Françoise Perrin (ca. 1665-1728). Present, his parents, Philippe Sauvage, secretary of the Marquis de La Chastre, residing rue du Mail, parish St. Eutache, cousin of the groom, Françoise Perrin, mother of the bride, Antoine Coypel, painter to the king, keeps paintings and drawings by Her Majesty, the first painter of the Duc d'Orléans remaining galleries of the Louvre, brother of the bride, Christmas Nicolas Coypel, son of late Noel Coypel remaining street Nettles of this parish, brother mariée that signed".

Career
Dumont's son Edme Dumont, and his grandson Jacques-Edme Dumont also became sculptors. Lambert-Sigisbert Adam was one of his students as well. He executed for the Church of Saint-Sulpice, Paris four statues: St. Peter, St. Paul, St. John and St. Joseph. He was the first sculptor of Leopold, Duke of Lorraine, for which he worked in Nancy, France.

References
 Geneviève Bresc-Bautier, Isabelle Leroy-Jay Lemaistre (under the direction of Jean-René Gaborit, with the collaboration of Jean-Charles Agboton Helen Grollemund Michele Lafabrie Beatrice Tupinier-Barillon), Louvre Museum. Department of sculptures from the Middle Ages, Renaissance and modern times. French Sculpture II. Renaissance and modern times. flight. 1 Adam - Gois, Éditions de la Réunion des Musées Nationaux, Paris, 1998
 Pierre Kjellberg, New Guide statues of Paris, La Bibliothèque des Arts, Paris, 1988
 Leon Charvet, Meeting Corporate Fine Arts departments, the Ministry of National Education, Paris, 1890

1688 births
1729 deaths
18th-century French sculptors
French male sculptors
Artists from Paris
18th-century French male artists